The manytooth conger (Conger triporiceps), also known as the manytooth conger eel or simply the conger eel, is an eel in the family Congridae (conger/garden eels). It was described by Robert H. Kanazawa in 1958. It is a tropical, marine eel which is known from the western Atlantic Ocean, including the United States, Bermuda, the Antilles, the western Caribbean, and Brazil. It dwells at a depth range of 3–55 meters, and leads a benthic lifestyle, inhabiting rocky regions and coral reefs. Males can reach a maximum total length of 100 centimeters, but more commonly reach a TL of 80 cm.

The manytooth conger is harvested by subsistence fisheries.

References

manytooth conger
Fish of the Caribbean
Fauna of Bermuda
Taxa named by Robert H. Kanazawa
manytooth conger